This is a list of butterflies of Saudi Arabia. About 79 species are known from Saudi Arabia.

Papilionidae

Papilioninae

Papilionini
Papilio machaon syriacus Verity, 1908
Papilio saharae saharae Oberthür, 1879
Papilio saharae rathjensi Warnecke, 1932
Papilio demodocus Esper, [1798]
Papilio demoleus Linnaeus, 1758

Pieridae

Coliadinae
Eurema brigitta (Stoll, [1780])
Colias croceus (Geoffroy, 1785)
Colias marnoana Rogenhofer, 1884

Pierinae
Colotis antevippe zera (Lucas, 1852)
Colotis daira (Klug, 1829)
Colotis ephyia (Klug, 1829)
Colotis euippe exole (Reiche, 1850)
Colotis evagore (Klug, 1829)
Colotis protomedia (Klug, 1829)
Colotis ungemachi (Le Cerf, 1922)
Calopieris eulimene (Klug, 1829)
Nepheronia buquetii buchanani (Rothschild, 1921)
Euchloe aegyptiaca Verity, 1911
Euchloe falloui falloui (Allard, 1867)
Euchloe falloui saudi Larsen, 1983
Zegris eupheme larseni Pittaway, 1986

Pierini
Mylothris arabicus Gabriel, 1954
Belenois creona leucogyne Butler, 1885

Lycaenidae

Theclinae
Myrina silenus nzoiae d'Abrera, 1980

Theclini
Hypolycaena pachalica Butler, 1888
Iolaus glaucus Butler, 1886
Iolaus nursei Butler, 1896
Deudorix antalus (Hopffer, 1855)
Deudorix livia (Klug, 1834)

Lycaeninae
Lycaena phlaeas shima Gabriel, 1954

Polyommatinae

Lycaenesthini
Anthene amarah (Guérin-Méneville, 1849)
Anthene arora Larsen, 1983

Polyommatini
Cacyreus virilis Stempffer, 1936
Leptotes pirithous (Linnaeus, 1767)
Tuxentius gabrieli Balint, 1999
Tarucus balkanicus (Freyer, 1843)
Tarucus rosacea (Austaut, 1885)
Tarucus theophrastus (Fabricius, 1793)
Zizeeria karsandra (Moore, 1865)
Zizula hylax (Fabricius, 1775)
Azanus moriqua (Wallengren, 1857)
Azanus ubaldus (Stoll, 1782)
Pseudophilotes abencerragus nabataeus (Graves, 1925)
Euchrysops lois (Butler, 1886)
Euchrysops malathana (Boisduval, 1833)
Euchrysops osiris (Hopffer, 1855)
Euchrysops philbyi Gabriel, 1954
Chilades parrhasius (Fabricius, 1793)
Plebejidea loewii uranicola (Walker, 1870)
Kretania philbyi (Graves, 1925)
Lepidochrysops forsskali Larsen, 1982
Lepidochrysops pittawayi Larsen, 1983
Brephidium exilis (Boisduval, 1852)

Nymphalidae

Satyrinae

Melanitini
Melanitis leda (Linnaeus, 1758)

Satyrini
Lasiommata felix (Warnecke, 1929)
Ypthima asterope (Klug, 1832)
Hipparchia tewfiki (Wiltshire, 1949)

Nymphalinae

Nymphalini
Junonia orithya here Lang, 1884
Precis limnoria (Klug, 1845)
Hypolimnas misippus (Linnaeus, 1764)
Melitaea deserticola macromaculata Belter, 1934
Melitaea deserticola sargon Hemming, 1932

Biblidinae

Biblidini
Byblia anvatara acheloia (Wallengren, 1857)
Eurytela dryope brittoni Gabriel, 1954

Limenitinae

Adoliadini
Hamanumida daedalus (Fabricius, 1775)

Heliconiinae

Acraeini
Acraea chilo yemensis Le Doux, 1931
Acraea neobule Doubleday, 1847
Acraea doubledayi azvaki d'Abrera, 1980
Acraea encedon rathjensi Le Doux, 1933
Acraea serena (Fabricius, 1775)

Hesperiidae

Pyrginae

Celaenorrhinini
Sarangesa phidyle (Walker, 1870)

Carcharodini
Spialia colotes semiconfluens de Jong, 1978
Spialia doris (Walker, 1870)
Spialia mafa higginsi Evans, 1937
Spialia spio (Linnaeus, 1764)
Gomalia elma (Trimen, 1862)

Hesperiinae

Baorini
Borbo gemella (Mabille, 1884)
Gegenes hottentota (Latreille, 1824)
Gegenes nostrodamus (Fabricius, 1793)
Gegenes pumilio (Hoffmansegg, 1804)

See also
List of moths of Saudi Arabia
Wildlife of Saudi Arabia

References

Lists of butterflies by location
Butterflies
Butterflies by country
S

Butterflies